James Roche may refer to:

 James Roche (General Motors) (1906–2004), chairman and CEO of General Motors
 James G. Roche (born 1939), 20th Secretary of the United States Air Force
 James Roche, 3rd Baron Fermoy (1852–1920), Irish peer and politician
 James Jeffrey Roche (1847–1908), Irish-American poet, journalist and diplomat
 James Roche (bishop), Irish Roman Catholic bishop
 Jim Roche (hurler) (James Roche, 1909–1980), Irish hurler
 James Roche, member of the Australian pop music group Bachelor Girl
 James Roche (1770–1853), Irish wine merchant, patron of the Royal Cork Institution

See also
 Jim Roche (disambiguation)
 Jimmy Joe Roche, American visual artist and underground filmmaker, flourishing since the 1990s